The Royal Hungarian  or Royal Hungarian , commonly known as the  (collectively, the ), was one of the four armed forces ( or ) of Austria-Hungary from 1867 to 1918, along with the Austrian Landwehr, the Common Army and the Imperial and Royal Navy. The term honvéd was used to refer to all members of the Hungarian land forces in 1848-49, but it was also used to refer to enlisted private soldiers without a rank.

History 

The word honvéd in Hungarian (sometimes "honved" in English sources) means "defender of the homeland" and first appeared during the 1848 revolutions. At that time it was the name given to volunteers who were engaged for several weeks or a gyözelemig (i.e. "until victory") and sent to fight the Serbs and Croats. Subsequently, the bulk of the fighting was against the Empire of Austria, whereupon a number of regular imperial regiments went over to the Hungarian side. Some volunteers were attached to these existing regiments and some joined new regular regiments. Consequently, the term honvéd was used to refer to all members of the Hungarian land forces in 1848-49. The Honvéd was finally defeated by Austria with Russian assistance.

Following the Austro-Hungarian Compromise of 1867, the Royal Hungarian Honvéd was restored for Hungary, and the Imperial-Royal Landwehr was created for Austria, but both states had to continue to finance the Austro-Hungarian Common Army, much larger than both. A common Austro-Hungarian War Ministry was formed immediately for the large Common Army, but it had no right to command directly the smaller Austrian Landwehr and the Hungarian Honvéd armies, which were respectively placed under the direct control of the separate Austrian and Hungarian Ministries of Defence. The Austrian and Hungarian Ministers of Defence were not placed under the command and jurisdiction of the Common War Ministry; they were subordinated only to their own prime ministers and the respective parliaments in Vienna and Budapest. The Hungarian Honvéd army could join the imperial army only with the explicit authorization of the Hungarian government.

The monarch became the supreme warlord, holding all authority over the structure, organization, and administration of the army. He appointed the senior officials, had the right to declare war, and was the commander-in-chief of the army.

On 21 May 1893 the Honvéd Memorial was unveiled in Budapest in commemoration of the deeds of the Hungarian national army during the Hungarian Revolution of 1848-49. From 1919 to 1945, Honvédség was also a name given to the Royal Hungarian Army.

Structure 
The Hungarian Landwehr consisted of territorial units from the Hungarian half of the Empire (called Transleithania or the Lands of the Crown of Saint Stephen. These territories included what is present-day Hungary, Slovakia (so-called Upper Hungary) and parts of the present-day countries of Romania, including Transylvania and Banat, Serbia, Croatia, Slovenia (Prekmurje/Üpper Mur) and Austria (Burgenland).

Usually the term Landwehr implies units of limited fighting power. This was not the case in the Hungarian Honvéd. Although weaker in numbers - there were only three battalions per infantry regiment instead of the usual four in the Common Army - the troops were regular combat soldiers and were highly trained.

The Royal Hungarian Honvéd was divided into the Hungarian Honvéd and the Royal Croatian Home Guard (also called the Croatian-Slavonian Landwehr). The Croatian–Hungarian Settlement of 1868 granted the Croats the right to introduce Croatian as their working and command language within their units. In addition, the Croatian-Slavonian Honvéd units were subordinated to the Ban in Agram and not to the National Defence Minister in Budapest. However, both Ban and the Defence Minister were subordinated to the Prime Minister of Hungary .

Recruitment 
In peacetime the officers of the Hungarian Honvéd either transferred from regular Hungarian regiments of the Common Army (K.u.K.) or graduated from the Ludovika Military Academy (a cadet school opened in 1872 specifically for the training of Honvéd officers) in Budapest. From 1869 onward the rank and file soldiers of the Honvéd were recruited as part of the general conscription process of the Common Army with individual Hungarian conscripts being allocated to specific K.u.K. or Honvéd regiments according to the numbers required. Entry to the Honvéd contingent or to the Common Army was decided by drawing lots. Enlisted at the age of 21 the Honvéd soldier usually undertook 24 months of active service before passing into the reserve. The commitment for compulsory service ended at the age of 36.

Landwehr districts 
I Landwehr District – Budapest
M.kir. I budapesti honvéd kerületi parancsnokság

II Landwehr District – Szeged
M.kir. II szegedi honvéd kerületi parancsnokság

III Landwehr District – Kassa (Kaschau; now Košice, Slovakia)
M.kir. II kassai honvéd kerületi parancsnokság

IV Landwehr District – Pozsony (Pressburg; now Bratislava, Slovakia)
M.kir. IV pozsonyi honvéd kerületi parancsnokság

V Landwehr District – Kolozsvár (Klausenburg, now Cluj-Napoca, Romania)
M.kir. V kolozsvári honvéd kerületi parancsnokság

VI Landwehr District – Zagreb (Agram)
M.kir. VI zágrábi horvát-szlavon kerületi parancsnokság

Formations and units of the Royal Hungarian Honvéd 
The Royal Hungarian Honvéd was the standing army of Hungary. A part of the Honvéd was the Royal Croatian Home Guard (Kraljevsko hrvatsko domobranstvo), which consisted of 1 infantry division (out of 7 in the Honvéd) and 1 cavalry regiment (out of 10 in the Honvéd). Its order of battle at the outbreak of the First World War in 1914 was as follows (Hungarian designations listed in singular form):

 6 Landwehr districts (honvéd katonai kerület)
 2 infantry divisions (honvéd gyalogos hadosztály)
 2 cavalry divisions (honvéd lovassági hadosztály)
 4 infantry brigades (honvéd gyalogosdandár)
 12 independent infantry brigades (honvéd önálló gyalogdandár)
 4 cavalry brigades (honvéd lovasdandár)
 32 infantry regiments (honvéd gyalogezred)
 10 regiments of hussars (honvéd huszárezred)
 8 field artillery regiments (honvéd tábori ágyúsezred)
 1 horse artillery battalion (honvéd lóvontatású tüzérosztály)

In 1915, units of the whole Army that had nicknames or honorific titles lost them by order of the War Ministry. Thereafter units were designated only by their numerical designation, but the practice of honoric titles remained in the Honvéd.

All details relate to the year 1914:

Infantry divisions 
20th Honvéd Infantry Division – Nagyvárad (Großwardein)
Commander: Feldmarschalleutnant Friedrich von Csanády
39th Honvéd Infantry Brigade – Nagyvárad
Commander: Major General Koloman Patzák
40th Honvéd Infantry Brigade – Szatmárnémeti (Sathmar)
Commanding Officer: Colonel Béla Tarnáky
41st Honvéd Infantry Division – Budapest
Commander: Feldmarschalleutnant Johann Nikić
81st Honvéd Infantry Brigade – Budapest
Commander: Major General Eugen Perneczky
82nd Honvéd Infantry Brigade – Veszprém (Wesprim)
Commander: Major General Rudolf Schamschula

Independent infantry brigades 
45th Honvéd Infantry Brigade – Szeged
Commander: Major General Rudolf Seide
46th Honvéd Infantry Brigade – Lugos
Commander: Major General Lehel Festl
73rd Honvéd Infantry Brigade – Pozsony
Commanding Officer: Colonel Paul von Nagy
74th Honvéd Infantry Brigade – Nyitra
Commander: Major General Franz Cvrček
75th Honvéd Infantry Brigade – Kolozsvár
Commander: Major General Karl Lippner von Nagyszentmiklós
76th Honvéd Infantry Brigade – Nagyszeben
Commanding Officer: Colonel Adalbert Benke von Tardoskedd
77th Honvéd Infantry Brigade – Kassa
Commanding Officer: Colonel Desiderius Molnár von Péterfalva
78th Honvéd Infantry Brigade – Miskolcz
Commander: Major General Josef Foglár
79th Honvéd Infantry Brigade – Budapest
Commander: Major General Koloman Tabajdi
80th Honvéd Infantry Brigade – Pécs
Commanding Officer: Colonel Johann Háber
83rd Honvéd Infantry Brigade – Agram
Commander: Major General Nikolaus Ištvanović von Ivanska
84th Honvéd Infantry Brigade – Osijek
Commanding Officer: Colonel Daniel Kolak

Cavalry divisions  
5th Honvéd Cavalry Division Budapest
Commander: Feldmarschalleutnant Ernst Anton von Froreich-Szábo
19th Honvéd Cavalry Brigade – Budapest
Commander: Major General Ferdinand Graf von Bissingen und Nippenburg
23rd Honvéd Cavalry Brigade – Zalaegerszeg
Commanding Officer: Colonel Baron Colbert Zech
11th Honvéd Cavalry Division – Debreczen
Commander: Major General Julius Freiherr Nagy von Töbör-Éthe
22nd Landwehr Cavalry Brigade – Szeged
Commanding Officer: Colonel Karl Czitó
24th Landwehr Cavalry Brigade – Kassa
Commanding Officer: Colonel Ladislaus Jóny von Jamnik

Infantry regiments

Cavalry regiments 

1st Budapest Honvéd Hussars
19th Honvád Cavalry Brigade – 5th Honvéd Cavalry Division
Commanding Officer: Colonel Colbert Zech von Deybach Freiherr von Hart und Sulz – Debachi Zech Colbert 
2nd Debreczen Honvéd Hussars
22nd Honvéd Cavalry Brigade – 11th Honvéd Cavalry Division
Commanding Officer: Lieutenant Colonel Johann Flór – Flór János alezredes
3rd Szeged Honvéd Hussars
22nd Honvéd Cavalry Brigade – 11th Honvéd Cavalry Division
Commanding Officer: Lieutenant Colonel Árpád Cserépy von Kisruszka – Kisruszkai Cserépy Árpád alezredes
4th Szabadka Honvéd Hussars
I and II Sqns, 23rd Honvéd Infantry Division
III and IV Sqns, 20th Honvéd Infantry Division
V and VI Sqns, 41st Honvéd Infantry Division
Commanding Officer: Lieutenant Colonel Nikolaus Jankovich von Jeszenicze – Jeszeniczai Jankovich Miklós alezredes
5th Kassa Honvéd Hussars
24th Honvéd Cavalry Brigade – 11th Honvéd Cavalry Division
Commanding Officer: Colonel Paul Hegedüs – Hegedüs Pál ezredes
6th Zalaegerszeg Honvéd Hussars
23rd Honvéd Cavalry Brigade – 5th Honvéd Cavalry Division
Commanding Officer: Lieutenant Colonel Ladislaus Forster von Szenterzsébet – Szenterzsébeti Forster László alezredes
7th Pápa Honvéd Hussars
23rd Honvéd Cavalry Brigade – 5th Honvéd Cavalry Division
Commanding Officer: Colonel Johann Graf Lubienski – Gróf Lubienski János ezredes
Pécs Honvéd Hussars 8
19th Honvéd Cavalry Brigade – 5th Honvéd Cavalry Division
Commanding Officer: Lieutenant Colonel Alexius Thege von Konkoly – Konkoly Thege Elek alezredes
9th Maros-Vásárhely Honvéd Hussars
24th Honvéd Cavalry Brigade -1st Honvéd Cavalry Division
Commanding Officer: Colonel Koloman Géczy von Garamszeg – Garamszegi Géczy Kálmán ezredes
10th Varazdin Honvéd Hussars
I and II Sqns, 36th Honvéd Infantry Division
III and IV Sqns, 42nd Honvéd Infantry Division
V and VI Sqns, 13th Honvéd Infantrybrigade
Commanding Officer: Lieutenant Colonel Alois Hauer – Hauer Alajos alezredes

Field artillery regiments 
1st Regiment of Artillery – 1. honvéd tábori ágyúsezred
Garrison: Budapest – 4th Honvéd Infantry Division – I Landwehr District
formed: 1913
Commanding Officer: Colonel Anton Hellebronth von Tiszabeö – Tiszabeöi Hellebronth Antal ezredes
2nd Regiment of Field Artillery – 2 honvéd tábori ágyúsezred
Garrison: Nagyszeben – 23rd Honvéd Infantry Division – V Landwehr District
formed: 1914
Commanding Officer: Lieutenant Colonel Ladislaus Thaisz – Thaisz Lázló alezredes
3rd Regiment of Field Artillery  – 3 honvéd tábori ágyúsezred
Garrison: Kassa – 39th Honvéd Infantry Division – III Landwehr District
formed: 1914
Commanding Officer: Lieutenant Colonel Heinrich Loidin – Loidin Henrik alezredes
4th Regiment of Field Artillery – 4 honvéd tábori ágyúsezred
Garrison: Nyitra – 37th Honvéd Infantry Division – IV Landwehr District
formed: 1914
Commanding Officer: Lieutenant Colonel Alexander Mattanovich – Mattanovich Sándor alezredes
5th Regiment of Field Artillery – 5 honvéd tábori ágyúsezred
Garrison: Maros-Vásarhely – 38th Honvéd Infantry Division – V Landwehr District
formed: 1914
Commanding Officer: Lieutenant Colonel Egon Stráner – Sztráner Jenő alezredes
6th Regiment of Field Artillery – 6 honvéd tábori ágyúsezred
Garrison: Agram – 42nd Honvéd Infantry Division – VI Landwehr District
formed: 1914
Commanding Officer: Lieutenant Colonel Rudolf Sekulić – Sekulić Rezső alezredes
7th Regiment of Field Artillery  – 7 honvéd tábori ágyúsezred
Garrison: Hajmaskér – 41st Honvéd Infantry Division – VII Landwehr District
formed: 1914
Commanding Officer: Lieutenant Colonel Gustav Kapp – Capp Gusztáv alezredes
8th Regiment of Field Artillery – 8th honvéd tábori ágyúsezred
Garrison: Hajmaskér – 20th Honvéd Infantry Division – II Landwehr District
formed: 1914
Commanding Officer: Colonel Albert Pohl – Pohl Albert ezredes
1st Honvéd Horse Artillery Division – honvéd lovastüzér osztály
Garrison: Szeged – 11th Honvéd Cavalry Division – II Landwehr District
formed: 1914

Museum coverage 
The history of Austro-Hungarian forces is documented in detail in the Military History Museum in Vienna, which was founded by Emperor Franz Joseph I as the Imperial-Royal Court Armaments Museum (k.k. Hofwaffenmuseum). In a special display cabinet in Hall V (the Franz Joseph Hall) of the museum, several uniforms of the Imperial Royal Landwehr are displayed, a relief on the rear of the cabinet shows the territories from which the Hungarian Landwehr and the Imperial Royal Landwehr recruited.

References

Literature and sources 

 Allmayer-Beck, Johann Christoph and Lessing, Erich (1974). Die K.u.k. Armee. 1848–1918 ("The Imperial and Royal Army 1848-1918"), Verlag Bertelsmann, Munich, 1974, .
 k.u.k. Kriegsministerium Dislokation und Einteilung des k.u.k Heeres, der k.u.k. Kriegsmarine, der k.k. Landwehr und der k.u. Landwehr ("Location and Organization of the k.u.k. Army, the k.u.k. Navy, the k.k. Landwehr and the k.u. Landwehr") in Seidel's kleines Armeeschema – published by Seidel & Sohn, Vienna, 1914
 Rest, Stefan, Ortner, M. Christian and Ilmig, Thomas (2002). Des Kaisers Rock im 1. Weltkrieg ("The Emperor's Coat in the First World War"). Verlag Militaria, Vienna. 
 k.u.k. Kriegsministerium (1911/12). Adjustierungsvorschrift für das k.u.k. Heer, die k.k. Landwehr, die k.u. Landwehr, die verbundenen Einrichtungen und das Korps der Militärbeamten ("Dress Regulations for the k.u.k. Army, the k.k. Landwehr, the k.u. Landwehr, the Associated Organizations and the Corps of Military Officials"), Vienna.

Military history of Hungary
Austro-Hungarian Army
Establishments in the Kingdom of Hungary (1867–1918)